The Transvaal rock gecko (Afroedura transvaalica) is a species of gecko endemic to Southern Africa.

Common names
Additional common names for Afroedura transvaalica include Limpopo flat gecko, Transvaal flat gecko, and Zimbabwe flat gecko.

Taxonomy
It was originally described as a new species and given its binomial name by South African herpetologist John Hewitt in 1925.

Geographic range
Both the specific name, transvaalica, and the English common name, Transvaal flat gecko, are misnomers, in a sense, as A. transvaalica occurs almost exclusively in Zimbabwe; however, small populations with small distributions occur in northern Limpopo, South Africa and in north-western Mozambique. The largest part of its range, 90% or more, covers Zimbabwe, and it is one of the species that make up Zimbabwe's endemic and near-endemic gecko fauna.

Habitat

Behaviour
Transvaal flat geckos are very social geckos and nocturnal; they hide during the day under flakes of rock.

Diet
A. transvaalica is insectivorous and will tackle large beetles, crickets, and grasshoppers.

Breeding
Sexual mature females of A. transvaalica lay a pair of hard-shelled eggs usually in a communal nesting site. The eggs are soft and adhesive when first laid.

Subspecies
No subspecies is recognized. The race formerly known as Afroedura t. loveridgei has been raised to full species status as Afroedura loveridgei. It occurs only in suitable habitat around Tete in the Zambesi River Valley.

References

Further reading
Hewitt J. 1925. On some new species of Reptiles and Amphibians from South Africa. Records of the Albany Museum (Grahamstown, South Africa) 3: 343–370. (Oedura transvaalica, new species, p. 350).

transvaalica
Reptiles of Botswana
Reptiles of Mozambique
Reptiles of South Africa
Reptiles of Zimbabwe
Reptiles described in 1925
Taxa named by John Hewitt (herpetologist)